Adrian Monck is the Managing Director, Head of Public And Social Engagement at the World Economic Forum and a former British journalism professor and writer on the media and current affairs.

Education
Adrian Monck graduated from Exeter College, Oxford in 1988 with an honours degree in Modern History. At Oxford he was JCR President and edited Cherwell. In 2000 he was awarded an MBA from London Business School.

Television journalism
Monck went on to be a TV journalist with CBS News (1988–92), ITV News (1992–1996), five news (1996–2004) and Sky News (2005). His work on the Dunblane massacre and in Bosnia received awards from Britain's Royal Television Society, and on aid to Rwanda won the special report gold medal, and overall festival prize at the 1995 New York Festivals.

He launched and was Deputy and Managing Editor of ITN's service for Britain's fifth terrestrial network, Channel 5. The service, fronted by Kirsty Young, won awards for its new informal style of news presentation and reporting which were quickly copied by rivals.

Academia
Before becoming managing director and Head of Communications at the World Economic Forum Adrian Monck headed City University's Department of Journalism from 2005 – 2009. 

He is an advocate of extending UK TV regulation of journalism to newspapers and online media but is critical of public funding for journalism. In 2006 he presented a lecture entitled Why the Public Doesn't Deserve the News.

He is quoted in Bad News From Israel, by Greg Philo (of the Glasgow Media Group), Howard Tumber and Frank Webster's Journalists Under Fire: Information War and Journalistic Practices and Richard Lindley's And Finally...The History of ITN.

References

1965 births
Academics of City, University of London
Alumni of Exeter College, Oxford
Alumni of London Business School
English columnists
English male journalists
ITN newsreaders and journalists
Journalism academics
Living people